Choras District is one of eight districts of the province Yarowilca in Peru.

Ethnic groups 
The people in the district are mainly indigenous citizens of Quechua descent. The Quechua languages are the languages which the majority of the population (64.40%) learnt to speak in childhood, 35.45% of the residents started speaking using the Spanish language (2007 Peru Census).

See also 
 Laksha Warina

References